Nauris is a Latvian masculine given name.

People bearing the name Nauris include:

Nauris Bulvītis (born 1987), footballer 
Nauris Puntulis (born 1961), politician
Nauris Skraustiņš (born 1978), luger

References

Latvian masculine given names
Masculine given names